Go Bong-jae (born 14 May 1993) is a South Korean professional baseball pitcher who is currently playing for the Doosan Bears of the KBO League. He is a sidearm pitcher. He graduated from Howon University and was selected for the Doosan Bears by a draft in 2016 (2nd draft, 3rd round).

References

External links 

 Career statistics and player information from KBO League
 Go Bong-jae  at Doosan Bears Baseball Club

1993 births
Living people
Sportspeople from Busan
South Korean baseball players
KBO League pitchers
Doosan Bears players